Wayne is a town in Kennebec County, Maine, United States. The population was 1,129 at the 2020 census. The town was named after Revolutionary War General Anthony Wayne. During the summer, Wayne is home to Camp Androscoggin. A popular recreation spot in central Maine, Wayne is part of the Winthrop Lakes Region. The town is included in the Augusta, Maine micropolitan New England City and Town Area.

Geography
The Androscoggin Yacht Club is located in Wayne on Androscoggin Lake, at the foot of the road over Morrison Heights.

Demographics

2010 census
As of the census of 2010, there were 1,189 people, 514 households, and 358 families living in the town. The racial makeup of the town was 98.9% White, 0.2% Asian, 0.7% from other races, and 0.3% from two or more races. Hispanic or Latino of any race were 0.8% of the population.

There were 514 households, of which 24.9% had children under the age of 18 living with them, 58.9% were married couples living together, 6.8% had a female householder with no husband present, 3.9% had a male householder with no wife present, and 30.4% were non-families. 24.1% of all households were made up of individuals, and 9.9% had someone living alone who was 65 years of age or older. The average household size was 2.31 and the average family size was 2.68.

The median age in the town was 49.1 years. 19.3% of residents were under the age of 18; 5.3% were between the ages of 18 and 24; 18.1% were from 25 to 44; 40.6% were from 45 to 64; and 16.7% were 65 years of age or older. The gender makeup of the town was 50.5% male and 49.5% female.

2000 census
As of the census of 2000, there were 1,112 people, 467 households, and 330 families living in the town. The racial makeup of the town was 98.56% White, 0.27% African American, 0.09% Asian, and 1.08% from two or more races. Hispanic or Latino of any race were 0.18% of the population.

There were 465 households, out of which 30.5% had children under the age of 18 living with them, 60.2% were married couples living together, 6.0% had a female householder with no husband present, and 29.0% were non-families. 22.8% of all households were made up of individuals, and 9.9% had someone living alone who was 65 years of age or older. The average household size was 2.39 and the average family size was 2.80.

In the town, the population was spread out, with 23.5% under the age of 18, 4.5% from 18 to 24, 24.9% from 25 to 44, 30.6% from 45 to 64, and 16.5% who were 65 years of age or older. The median age was 44 years. For every 100 females, there were 104.0 males. For every 100 females age 18 and over, there were 93.8 males.

The median income for a household in the town was $45,625, and the median income for a family was $54,632. Males had a median income of $40,625 versus $29,659 for females. The per capita income for the town was $26,015. About 3.9% of families and 5.9% of the population were below the poverty line, including 4.7% of those under age 18 and 8.3% of those age 65 or over.

Notable people
T. Brigham Bishop (1835–1905), American composer of popular music
John Emory Bryant, Union Army Civil War veteran, Freedman Bureau official in Georgia, Republican Party organizer, and temperance movement advocate
Annie Louise Cary (1842–1921), popular American singer
Allen P. Lovejoy, Wisconsin politician

Further reading
 "A Happy Abundance : Tales, Memoirs and More Past and Present in Wayne, Maine" (2008)
 "History of the Town of Wayne, Kennebec County, Maine, From its Settlement to 1898" (1898)
 "History of Wayne, Maine - In Celebration of Wayne's Bicentennial 1798-1998" (1998)

See also
 Wing Family Cemetery
 Camp Androscoggin

References

Towns in Kennebec County, Maine
Towns in Maine